Dominique Jackson may refer to:

 Dominique Jackson (British actress) (born 1991), British television and film actress
 Dominique Jackson (model) (born 1975), Tobagonian-American actress, author, model, and reality television personality
 Dominique Jackson (politician), former member of the Colorado House of Representatives